Syntaxis may refer to:

 Syntaxis, a writing style that favours complex syntax
 Syntaxis Mathematica, an alternative name of Ptolemy's Almagest
 Syntaxis, a synonym of the moth genus Leucoperina
 Syntaxis (geology), an abrupt major change in the orientation of an orogenic belt

See also 
 Sintaksis, a Russian émigré journal edited by Maria Rozanova
 Sintaksis (Moscow), a samizdat poetry periodical edited by Alexander Ginzburg
 Syntax (disambiguation)